Dichelia alexiana is a species of moth of the family Tortricidae. It is found in Turkey, where it is only known from Hatay Province.

References

Moths described in 1919
Archipini